Ferizi (also Romanized as Ferīzī) is a village in Tus Rural District, in the Central District of Mashhad County, Razavi Khorasan Province, Iran. At the 2006 census, its population was 869, in 217 families.

References 

Populated places in Mashhad County